In mathematics, the method of characteristics is a technique for solving partial differential equations.  Typically, it applies to first-order equations, although more generally the method of characteristics is valid for any hyperbolic partial differential equation.  The method is to reduce a partial differential equation to a family of ordinary differential equations along which the solution can be integrated from some initial data given on a suitable hypersurface.

Characteristics of first-order partial differential equation
For a first-order PDE (partial differential equation), the method of characteristics discovers curves (called characteristic curves or just characteristics) along which the PDE becomes an ordinary differential equation (ODE).  Once the ODE is found, it can be solved along the characteristic curves and transformed into a solution for the original PDE.

For the sake of simplicity, we confine our attention to the case of a function of two independent variables x and y for the moment.  Consider a quasilinear PDE of the form

Suppose that a solution z is known, and consider the surface graph z = z(x,y) in R3.  A normal vector to this surface is given by

As a result, equation is equivalent to the geometrical statement that the vector field

is tangent to the surface z = z(x,y) at every point, for the dot product of this vector field with the above normal vector is zero.  In other words, the graph of the solution must be a union of integral curves of this vector field.  These integral curves are called the characteristic curves of the original partial differential equation and are given by  the Lagrange–Charpit equations

A parametrization invariant form of the Lagrange–Charpit equations is:

Linear and quasilinear cases
Consider now a PDE of the form

For this PDE to be linear, the coefficients ai may be functions of the spatial variables only, and independent of u.  For it to be quasilinear, ai may also depend on the value of the function, but not on any derivatives.  The distinction between these two cases is inessential for the discussion here.

For a linear or quasilinear PDE, the characteristic curves are given parametrically by

such that the following system of ODEs is satisfied

Equations and  give the characteristics of the PDE.

Proof for quasilinear Case 
In the quasilinear case, the use of the method of characteristics is justified by Grönwall's inequality. The above equation may be written as

We must distinguish between the solutions to the ODE and the solutions to the PDE, which we do not know are equal a priori. Letting capital letters be the solutions to the ODE we find

Examining , we find, upon differentiating that

which is the same as

We cannot conclude the above is 0 as we would like, since the PDE only guarantees us that this relationship is satisfied for
and we do not yet know that .

However, we can see that

since by the PDE, the last term is 0. This equals

By the triangle inequality, we have

Assuming  are at least , we can bound this for small times. Choose a neighborhood  around  small enough such that  are locally Lipschitz. From this, we find the above is bounded as

It is a straightforward application of Grönwall's Inequality to show that since  we have  for as long as this inequality holds. We have some interval  such that  in this interval. Choose the largest  such that this is true. Then, by continuity, . Provided the ODE still has a solution in some interval after , we can repeat the argument above to find that  in a larger interval. Thus, so long as the ODE has a solution, we have .

Fully nonlinear case
Consider the partial differential equation

where the variables pi are shorthand for the partial derivatives

Let (xi(s),u(s),pi(s)) be a curve in R2n+1.  Suppose that u is any solution, and that

Along a solution, differentiating with respect to s gives

The second equation follows from applying the chain rule to a solution u, and the third follows by taking an exterior derivative of the relation .  Manipulating these equations gives

where λ is a constant.  Writing these equations more symmetrically, one obtains the Lagrange–Charpit equations for the characteristic

Geometrically, the method of characteristics in the fully nonlinear case can be interpreted as requiring that the Monge cone of the differential equation should everywhere be tangent to the graph of the solution. The second order partial differential equation is solved with Charpit method .

Example 
As an example, consider the advection equation (this example assumes familiarity with PDE notation, and solutions to basic ODEs).

We want to transform this linear first-order PDE into an ODE along the appropriate curve; i.e. something of the form

where  is a characteristic line. First, we find

by the chain rule.  Now, if we set  and  we get

which is the left hand side of the PDE we started with. Thus

So, along the characteristic line , the original PDE becomes the ODE . That is to say that along the characteristics, the solution is constant. Thus,  where  and  lie on the same characteristic.  Therefore, to determine the general solution, it is enough to find the characteristics by solving the characteristic system of ODEs:

 , letting  we know ,
 , letting  we know ,
 , letting  we know .

In this case, the characteristic lines are straight lines with slope , and the value of  remains constant along any characteristic line.

Characteristics of linear differential operators 
Let X be a differentiable manifold and P a linear differential operator

of order k.  In a local coordinate system xi,

in which α denotes a multi-index. The principal symbol of P, denoted σP, is the function on the cotangent bundle T∗X defined in these local coordinates by

where the ξi are the fiber coordinates on the cotangent bundle induced by the coordinate differentials dxi.  Although this is defined using a particular coordinate system, the transformation law relating the ξi and the xi ensures that σP is a well-defined function on the cotangent bundle.

The function σP is homogeneous of degree k in the ξ variable. The zeros of σP, away from the zero section of T∗X, are the characteristics of P. A hypersurface of X defined by the equation F(x) = c is called a characteristic hypersurface at x if

Invariantly, a characteristic hypersurface is a hypersurface whose conormal bundle is in the characteristic set of P.

Qualitative analysis of characteristics 
Characteristics are also a powerful tool for gaining qualitative insight into a PDE.

One can use the crossings of the characteristics to find shock waves for potential flow in a compressible fluid. Intuitively, we can think of each characteristic line implying a solution to  along itself. Thus, when two characteristics cross, the function becomes multi-valued resulting in a non-physical solution. Physically, this contradiction is removed by the formation of a shock wave, a tangential discontinuity or a weak discontinuity and can result in non-potential flow, violating the initial assumptions.

Characteristics may fail to cover part of the domain of the PDE.  This is called a rarefaction, and indicates the solution typically exists only in a weak, i.e. integral equation, sense.

The direction of the characteristic lines indicates the flow of values through the solution, as the example above demonstrates.  This kind of knowledge is useful when solving PDEs numerically as it can indicate which finite difference scheme is best for the problem.

See also 
 Method of quantum characteristics

Notes

References 
 
 
 
 
 .

External links 
 Prof. Scott Sarra tutorial on Method of Characteristics
 Prof. Alan Hood tutorial on Method of Characteristics

Partial differential equations
Hyperbolic partial differential equations